Shine On with Reese is an American talk show hosted by actress Reese Witherspoon. The show was announced on July 10, 2018 and had its premiere one week later on DirecTV.

Shine On also marks Witherspoon's first unscripted role in her career.

Premise 
The show is a one-on-one interview between Witherspoon and a female guest focusing on how she achieved her dreams.

Background 
In November 2016, Witherspoon and Otter Media formed Hello Sunshine, a joint venture focused on telling female-driven stories on film, TV and digital platforms. The company has multiple series and films in development including Big Little Lies.

Before the formal announcement, the series was teased by Witherspoon in an interview on Good Morning America while promoting A Wrinkle in Time. The show was announced on July 10, 2018 on Witherspoon's Instagram. The first season will have nine episodes and will air on DirecTV's Hello Sunshine channel. All guests on the show were also announced in a press release.

Episodes

References

External list
 

2018 American television series debuts
2010s American television talk shows